Donohue is a surname of Irish origin abbreviated from O'Donohue. Notable people with the surname include:

 Adam Donohue (born 1990), Australian rules footballer
 Charles D. Donohue (1880–1928), New York politician and judge
 David Donohue (born 1967), American race car driver, also a chef from Maryland
 Erin Donohue (born 1983), American Track & Field athlete
 Harold Donohue (1901–1984), American politician
 Jack Donohue (disambiguation), several people
 Jerry Donohue (1920–1985), American theoretical and physical chemist
 Jim Donohue (born 1938), American baseball player
 Kathleen Donohue (born 1963), American plant biologist
 Keith Donohue (disambiguation), several people
 Kether Donohue (born 1985), actress
 Larry Donohue (born 1955), former Australian rules footballer
 Leon Donohue (1939-2016), American football player 
 Mark Donohue (1937–1975), American racecar driver
 Mark Donohue (linguist) (born 1967), British-Australian linguist
 Mary Donohue (born 1947), New York lieutenant governor and judge
 Niall Donohue (1990–2013), Irish hurler
 Nigel Donohue (born 1969), British judoka
 Pat Donohue (born 1953), American fingerstyle guitarist
 Pete Donohue (1900–1988), American baseball player
 Peter M. Donohue (21st century), American Roman Catholic priest
 Tom Donohue (born 1952), retired professional baseball player
 Thomas J. Donohue (born 1938), President and CEO of the United States Chamber of Commerce
 William Anthony Donohue (born 1947), American president of the Catholic League for Religious and Civil Rights in the United States
 William J. Donohue (c. 1873 – 1907), New York politician
 Sean Donohue (born 1981), founder of horror rock band Hard Rock Zombie and co-founder of industrial rock band Ruse of Silence. Also known for his work as Villain.

See also
 Donahue
 Donoghue (disambiguation)
 Donohue Inc., a former Canadian pulp and paper manufacturer
 Donohue syndrome
 O'Donohue
 

Anglicised Irish-language surnames